Awe is an emotion of respectful wonder.

AWE or awe may also refer to:

Organizations
 Atomic Weapons Establishment, provider of the UK's nuclear deterrent system
 US Airways, by ICAO airline code
 America West Airlines, an Airline that once used the ICAO code prior to the merger of US Airways.
 Australian Worldwide Exploration, a gas and oil company
 Automobilwerk Eisenach, a German automobile manufacturer
 AWE (TV network), an American cable network formerly known as Wealth TV

Computing
 Address Windowing Extensions, a Microsoft Windows memory handling mode
 Sound Blaster AWE32 (Advanced Wave Effects), a sound card made by Creative Labs

Places
 Awe, Kentucky, an unincorporated community in Lewis County
 Awe, Nigeria, a Local Government Area in Nasarawa State
 Loch Awe, a lake in Argyll and Bute, Scotland
 River Awe, the river from Loch Awe, Scotland
 AsiaWorld-Expo, convention and exhibition facility in Hong Kong
 AWE, code for AsiaWorld–Expo station at the exhibition facility in Hong Kong

Other uses
 Francis Awe, Nigerian musician
 Australian White Ensign, the ensign flown by ships of the Royal Australian Navy
 Pirates of the Caribbean: At World's End, the third installment of the Pirates of the Caribbean film series
 An informal South African greeting, pronounced aah-weh, see list of South African slang words
 Average Weekly Earnings, the lead indicator of short-term changes in earnings
 Airborne wind energy, direct use or generation of wind energy by the use of aerodynamic or aerostatic lift devices
 Awe (film), a 2018 Telugu language film

See also 
 Sublime (philosophy)
 Shock and awe, a military doctrine also known as rapid dominance